Luvia Petersen is a Canadian actress best known for her role on the TV series Continuum and Ghost Wars, where she was part of the main cast.

Petersen is also co-owner of Vancouver tattoo studio Liquid Amber Tattoo & Art Collective, which opened in 2001.

In 2015, Luvia married her wife, Jessie Robertson. They have been together since 2010. She is openly bisexual, and has spoken of being told not to publicly be with women in the past for fear it would damage her career. Peterson criticized the lack of LGBT actors playing LGBT roles in 2013.

Filmography

References

External links
 
 
 

Bisexual actresses
Canadian television actresses
Canadian film actresses
Canadian LGBT actors
Living people
1978 births